Aluminij Industries is an aluminium producing company and a subsidiary of M.T. Abraham Group based in Mostar, Bosnia and Herzegovina. Since 2020 it is leasing the production assets of Aluminij, an aluminum producer established in 1975 and for a long time one of the largest producers and exporters in Bosnia and Herzegovina. Since 2022, Aluminij Industries is the largest exporter in Bosnia and Herzegovina and the second largest importer.

History 

Aluminij, an aluminum producing company established in 1975, and one of the largest producers and exporters in Bosnia and Herzegovina ever since, halted its production in July 2019, after it had accumulated a large number of unpaid electricity bills from Elektroprivreda HZ HB, which in turn cut off its supply. The government of the Federation of Bosnia and Herzegovina, its largest shareholder, announced a rescue plan for the end of the year.

M.T. Abraham Group, an Israeli company with headquarters in Panama, stated in December 2019, that it plans to revitalise and rescue the existing smelter operations of Aluminij, to implement new operational efficiencies, expand the production and better the management. Thus, Aluminij Industries was established in 2020 in Mostar, as its subsidiary.

In April 2020, Aluminij Industries started leasing the production assets of Aluminij. The deal came after the negotiations between Aluminij's shareholders, including the Federation of Bosnia and Herzegovina, and after they accepted a revised offer from Aluminij Industries' parent company, M.T. Abraham Group. In 2021, Aluminij Industries was the second largest exporter in Bosnia and Herzegovina, as well as the largest importer. In 2022, Aluminij Industries became the largest exporter in Bosnia and Herzegovina, and was the second largest importer.

Footnotes

References 

 
 
 

Companies based in Mostar
2020 establishments in Bosnia and Herzegovina
Manufacturing companies established in 2020
Multinational companies
Aluminium companies of Bosnia and Herzegovina
Aluminium smelters
Aluminium
Brands of Bosnia and Herzegovina